Insulamon is genus of freshwater crabs, comprising four species:
Insulamon unicorn Ng & Takeda, 1992
Insulamon palawanense Freitag, 2012
Insulamon magnum Freitag, 2012
Insulamon johannchristiani Freitag, 2012

References

Potamoidea